Crux Easton wind engine is a Grade II listed Titt wind engine, used as a windpump, at Crux Easton, Hampshire, England, which has been restored to working order.

History
Erected for the Earl of Carnarvon in 1891. It was last used in the 1920s. The sails were removed in the 1960s and placed in storage. Restoration of the wind engine was undertaken by Hampshire Industrial Archaeology Society and Hampshire Mills Group with assistance from the British Engineerium, Hove for the Crux Easton Wind Engine Restoration Trust. The restoration was funded by the Heritage Lottery Fund, which was asked to contribute £149,750 of the estimated £226,180 cost. Other grants were received from Basingstoke & Deane District Council, Hampshire County Council. and the Vodafone Charitable Trust. Restoration of the wind engine was delayed due to an outbreak of Foot and Mouth disease. The restored wind engine was officially opened on 25 September 2002 by Sir George Young.

Description
Crux Easton wind engine is  a Titt Simplex geared wind engine. It has a  diameter sail mounted on a  hexagonal steel tower. It is winded by a six blade fantail. The wind engine was primarily used for pumping water, but also drove a circular saw and a pair of millstones. The mill is recorded as being capable of producing eight to ten sacks of flour per day.

Public access

Crux Easton wind engine is currently undergoing a refurbishment of the sails and is closed to the public.

References

External links
Crux Easton Wind Engine Conservation Trust website.
Windmill World

Windmills in Hampshire
Windmills completed in 1891
Water supply infrastructure
Grinding mills in the United Kingdom
Grade II listed buildings in Hampshire
Grade II listed windmills
Windpumps in the United Kingdom
Water supply and sanitation in England
1891 establishments in England